The Modern Bop is the fourth studio album by Australian rock band Mondo Rock, released in March 1984 and peaked at number 5 on the Kent Music Report.

Rolling Stone stated: “The album achieves the Mondo’s oft-quoted aim: ‘adult’ music that isn't soft or easy-listening.”

Track listing

Personnel
Mondo Rock:
Ross Wilson – vocals, guitar, harmonica
Eric McCusker – guitar, backing vocals
James Black – keyboards, guitar, backing vocals
James Gillard – bass, backing vocals
John James Hackett – drums

with:
Joe Camilleri – saxophone on "Flight 28"

Production team:
Producer – John Sayers, Mondo Rock
Engineers – John Sayers, John French, Ross Cockle
Assistant Engineers – Doug Brady, Gary Constable
Mixed by – John Sayers

Charts

References 

1984 albums
Mondo Rock albums
Polydor Records albums
Albums produced by John L Sayers